Lily Partridge (born 9 March 1991) is a British long-distance runner.

Major competition record

References

Living people
1991 births
British female long-distance runners
English female long-distance runners